The 1979–80 season was FC Dinamo București's 31st season in Divizia A. The change at the manager's level (Angelo Niculescu for Ion Nunweiller) didn't produce the desired results and Dinamo didn't matter in the fight for the title, ending far from the first two teams. Also, in the Romanian Cup Dinamo was eliminated in the first round, by the second division team Rapid București.

In the UEFA Cup, Dinamo eliminated Alki Larnaca from Cyprus, after an incredible 9–0 away win, but is eliminated (partially because of the referee) by Eintracht Frankfurt, team of Pezzey, Grabowsky and Holzenbein (2-0 and 0–3 in prolongation).

Results

UEFA Cup 

First round

Dinamo București won 12-0 on aggregate

Second round

Eintracht Frankfurt won 3-2 on aggregate

Squad 

Goalkeepers: Constantin Eftimescu, Constantin Traian Ștefan.

Defenders: Adrian Bădilaș, Florin Cheran, Cornel Dinu, Teodor Lucuță, Alexandru Sătmăreanu, Ioan Mărginean.

Midfielders: Ionel Augustin, Alexandru Custov, Ion Marin, Ion Moldovan, Gheorghe Mulțescu, Nelu Stănescu, Dorel Zamfir.

Forwards: Ion Apostol, Dudu Georgescu, Emilian Tevi, Cornel Țălnar, Cristian Vrînceanu.

References 
 www.labtof.ro
 www.romaniansoccer.ro

1979
Association football clubs 1979–80 season
Dinamo